The Tennessee logperch (Percina apina) is a freshwater fish in the perch family found in the Duck River in Middle Tennessee.

References

Percina
Fish described in 2017